IBM 1401, A User's Manual is the fourth full-length studio album by Icelandic musician Jóhann Jóhannsson, released by 4AD on October 30, 2006.

4AD released the album on vinyl for the first time on December 8, 2017. The reissue was a double LP pressing on clear-coloured vinyl and included two previously unreleased live bonus tracks.

Critical reception

Upon its release, IBM 1401, A User's Manual received mostly positive reviews from music critics. Pitchfork's Mark Richardson gave it a 6.9, saying that the record "begins beautifully" and has a "powerful finish", "but the long sag in the middle makes IBM 1401 – A User's Manual a bit harder to recommend overall."

Sal Cinquemani for Slant Magazine said that the album "gives you the sense of hearing something truly ancient being married to something very modern and present, and, then, something very futuristic." Cinquemani praised the album's ambition and thematic work while noting that it was less musically varied. "Some theorists claim humans can simulate anything with a computer, even a soul," Cinquemani concluded, "and with IBM 1401 - A User’s Manual, Jóhannsson comes chillingly close."

Track listing

Personnel

Credits for IBM 1401, A User's Manual adapted from Allmusic.

 Chris Bigg – art direction, design, photography
 Arnar Bjarnason – arranging
 City of Prague Philharmonic Orchestra – orchestra
 Elias Davidsson – recording
 Finnur Hakonarsson – mixing
 Jan Holzner – engineering
 Jóhann Jóhannsson – bells, celeste, Hammond organ, liner notes, piano, production, recording, vocals
 Örn Kaldalóns – recording
 Vaughan Oliver – art direction, design
 Erna Órnarsdóttir – vocals
 City of Prague Philharmonic Orchestra – ensemble
 Nick Webb – mastering

References

External links
 
 

2006 albums
Electronic albums by Icelandic artists
4AD albums
Jóhann Jóhannsson albums